"X" (originally titled "X Bitch") is a song written and performed by Atlanta-based rapper 21 Savage and American record producer Metro Boomin featuring American rapper Future. Produced by Savage and Metro, it was released on July 14, 2016 as the lead single from the their collaborative extended play, Savage Mode (2016). The song was certified double platinum by the Recording Industry Association of America (RIAA).

Background and release
On July 2, 2016, 21 Savage announced his collaborative EP with Metro Boomin, sharing the artwork and the release date. On July 14, he shared the EP's track listing and released "X" featuring Future as the project's first single. He released Savage Mode on July 15. While talking about the song's success in an interview with Rolling Out magazine, he said; "I knew the song was taking off when I looked at iTunes and saw the numbers and all the views".

Critical reception
Eric Diep of HipHopDX wrote that "X" is "a good entry point for listeners just learning about 21". Niya Hogans from Rolling Out gave the song a positive review, saying that it has "catchy lyrics and a dope beat". Rolling Stone ranked it at number 21 on its 50 Best Songs of 2016 list, commenting: “The Atlanta trap contender teams up with Future for a thugged-and-drugged banger, boasting "I spent your rent at the mall," while producer Metro Boomin gives it all a creepy cinematic vibe.” Fact named it as one of the 20 best rap and R&B tracks of 2016.

Music video
The music video for "X" was released on December 25, 2016. The video was directed by Vincent Lou.

Live performances
On September 17, 2016, 21 Savage performed the song at the BET Hip Hop Awards, which aired in the next month.

Charts

Weekly charts

Year-end charts

Certifications

Release history

References

External links

Lyrics of this song at Genius

2016 singles
2016 songs
21 Savage songs
Future (rapper) songs
Metro Boomin songs
Songs written by Future (rapper)
Songs written by Metro Boomin
Song recordings produced by Metro Boomin
Songs written by 21 Savage